Hyalocis is a genus of tree-fungus beetles in the family Ciidae.

Species
 Hyalocis yakushimensis Kawanabe, 1993

References

Ciidae genera